The Volvo B8RLE is a 7.7-litre-engined low-entry bus chassis manufactured by Volvo since 2013 for Euro VI markets. It was designed as a replacement for the B7RLE and the B9RLE. The right-hand drive version was launched in November 2014.

Initially available in two- and tri-axle variants, the articulated version of the B8RLE called the B8RLEA is available in Australia since late 2014. In 2017, Euro III and V versions were launched worldwide with engine outputs at 250 and 330 hp. The 250 hp version is marketed in Brazil as the Volvo B250RLE.

It is also available as a medium-floor bus chassis, known as Volvo B8R. Throughout Europe, the B8RLE is most commonly available as the semi-integral Volvo 8900LE. In the United Kingdom, the B8RLE is offered with MCV Evora and Wright Eclipse 3 bodywork, and formerly also with MCV Evolution 2 bodywork. Additionally, Plaxton has also developed a low-entry version called the Plaxton Panther LE coach based on the B8RLE chassis with the 6x2 tri-axles configuration, for the intercity bus-commuter coach market. In Spain the B8R and the B8RLE is only available with the bodywork Unvi Urbis, Castrosua Magnus E, Sunsundegui SB3 and Sunsundegui Astral (this bodywork is discontinued).

In the Philippines, Volvo Buses launched the B8RLE in August 2018. The bus chassis is imported from Borås, Sweden and bodywork is made by Autodelta Coach Builders.

In Indonesia, Indotruck Utama (as a representative of Volvo Buses Indonesia) launched the B8RLE in March 2019 at Busworld Southeast Asia.

Engines
D8K, 7698 cc, in-line 6-cylinder turbodiesel (2013–present)
 D8K280 - 206 kW (280 bhp), 1050 Nm, Euro VI
 D8K320 - 235 kW (320 bhp), 1200 Nm, Euro VI
 D8K350 - 258 kW (350 bhp), 1400 Nm, Euro VI

D8C, 7698 cc, in-line 6 cyl. turbodiesel (2017–present)
 D8C250 - 186 kW (250 bhp), 950 Nm, Euro III/Euro V
 D8C330 - 246 kW (330 bhp), 1200 Nm, Euro III/Euro V

Operators

Australia
 Brisbane Transport operate 139 Volgren Optimus-bodied B8RLEs, They also operate 40 articulated B8RLEAs.
 Transdev NSW operates 106 B8RLEs, with both Bustech and Volgren bodies, for Transport Buses in Sydney.
 Transperth operates 307 B8RLEs and 107 B8RLEAs, all with Volgren Optimus bodies. More are currently being delivered. 
 Transit Systems NSW operates 26 Volgren Optimus-bodied B8RLE, with 10 being the Euro 6 variant.
 Ventura Bus Lines operates several Volgren Optimus-bodied B8RLE and one Volgren Optimus-bodied B8RLEA.
 Busways operates 122 B8RLEs, 68 with Custom Bus bodies and the remaining 54 having Volgren Optimus bodies.
 Keolis Downer operates 53 Bustech bodied B8RLE's in Sydney and Newcastle.

One example of an Express Coach Builders-bodied B8RLE also exists as a special needs school bus in Perth, Western Australia.

United Kingdom
The first example in the United Kingdom was delivered to Arriva Shires & Essex in 2014. As at January 2021, 88 have been delivered with Lothian Buses the largest purchaser with 45, 15 of which are fitted with Wright 13.2m bodywork for subsidiary company East Coast Buses with the remaining 30 fitted with 12.9m MCV eVoRa bodies. East Yorkshire Motor Services purchased 6 with MCV Evolution bodywork in late 2015–2016. Stagecoach in the Fens have 17 B8RLEs on the Wright Eclipse 3 and MCV eVoRa, and Trentbarton also have some on the Wright Eclipse 3 body, Stagecoach South Wales have recently received an order of 12 eVoRa bodies for their TrawsCymru work.

South Korea
Since 2015, several bus operators in Gyeonggi Province including subsidiaries of KD Transportation Group are purchasing B8RLE double-deckers with its bodywork by Daji Motors Enterprise Co.(大吉汽車 in Taiwan), in order to handle exceeding demands of several express bus lines covering Seoul metropolitan area.

Taiwan 
In 2016, Kaohsiung Transportation introduced 2 3-axle open-top double-decker B8RLE bus with its bodywork by Daji Motors Enterprise(Chinese: 大吉汽車) in Kaohsiung, Taiwan. Then, San Chung Bus in Taipei and Tainan Bus in Tainan also introduced this 3-axle open-top double-decker B8RLE for city sightseeing routes.

In 2019, Shing Nan Bus Company in Tainan introduced 22 2-axle single-deck B8RLE bus with Daji Motors body, as a successor of its Daji-bodied B7RLE single-deck bus, for public bus service Tainan City Bus and THSR Shuttle Bus in urban and suburban Tainan.

Philippines
Since September 2018, Precious Grace Transport (Premium Point-to-Point bus or P2P) are purchasing B8RLE low-entry buses (Autodelta Volvo 8900LE replica) body by Autodelta Coach Builders, Inc. are built in Subic, Zambales, in order to handle exceeding demands of several Premium Point-to-Point bus service covering TriNoma to Bulacan route.

Chile 
Since 2020, the company Subus Chile, which is part of the Red Metropolitana de Movilidad, operates with 201 Volvo buses. A large part of the bus lines on which these buses operate are the most extensive in the system.

Gallery

References

External links

Introduction Volvo Buses

Vehicles introduced in 2013
B8RLE
Low-entry buses
Tri-axle buses
Articulated buses
Bus chassis